Sourav Sarkar, popularly known as Joy Sarkar, is a Kolkata based Indian Bengali film music composer. Sarkar mainly works in Bengali cinema and albums. He composed soundtracks for Jodi Ekdin (2010), Accident (2012), Muktodhara (2012), Bicycle Kick (2013), Half Serious (2013), Rupkatha Noy (2013), The play (2013), Antaraal (2013), Women Prayed and Preyed Upon (2013), Ek Phali Rodh (2014),
Abby Sen (2015), Kiriti Roy (2016), Nayikar Bhumikay (2017), Bilu Rakkhosh (2017), Pupa (2018), Reunion (2019), Shesher Golpo (2019), and Parcel (2019).

Personal life
Joy Sarkar was born on 1972, 11 January in Kolkata, India, to Sudhin Sarkar, who is a Bengali singer of yesteryears, and Kalyani Sarkar. He has an elder brother, Rana, who is also a musician. Due to the musical bent of his parents, music came to him spontaneously.

Sarkar is married to a Bengali singer Lopamudra Mitra since 2001.

Discography

Albums

Filmography
Joy Sarkar worked as music director for the following films.

Worked as music director for the following Webseries.

Singles 
"Mon Kemoner Station" with Shreya Ghoshal (2012)
"Kolkata Diaries" (Hindi) with Akriti Kakar (2016) 
"Khobor Diyo Hothat Kanna Pele" with Joy Sarkar (2016) 
"Dekha Jodi Ba Hoy Abar" with Shom Chatterjee (2016) 
"Ei Roko" with Joy Sarkar (2017) 
"Taar Daak Naam" with Srija (2017) 
Rabindra Sangeet albums ( Music Arrangement) 
"Bhalobasa Kare koy" with Srabani Sen (2003) 
"Bismaye" with Lopamudra Mitra (2003) 
"Krishnakali" with Lopamudra Mitra (2004) 
"Mone Rekho" with Lopamudra Mitra (2006) 
"Ananda The Ecstasy" with Lopamudra Mitra (2009) 
"Silent Amazement" with Rituparna Sengupta, Lopamudra Mitra, Sujoy Prasad Chatterjee (2012) 
"Akash-The Infinite" with Lopamudra Mitra (2017)
"Ajana Gaaner Ajana" with Subhamita Banerjee 2019
"Hoytoh Prem" with Shaan and Akriti Kakkar 2018

References

Living people
Bengali musicians
Bengali singers
Bengali playback singers
Indian male singer-songwriters
Indian singer-songwriters
Indian film score composers
Indian male playback singers
Singers from Kolkata
Indian male film score composers
1972 births